"Speechless" is a song recorded by American country music duo Dan + Shay for their 2018 self-titled third studio album. The song was written by Dan Smyers and Shay Mooney along with Jordan Reynolds and Laura Veltz. It was first released digitally as a promotional single on May 18, 2018. "Speechless" was serviced to country radio on August 6, 2018 as the album's second official single. A new version featuring Tori Kelly was released on June 6, 2019.

"Speechless" reached number one on both the Billboard Hot Country Songs and Country Airplay charts. It also peaked at number 24 on the Billboard Hot 100. In Canada, the song has reached number 2 on the Canada Country airplay chart and at number 41 on the Canadian Hot 100. "Speechless" was certified Gold by the Recording Industry Association of America (RIAA) and Platinum by Music Canada.

Composition
The song is composed in the key of D major with a main chord pattern of D-Fm-G7-E7. It has an approximate tempo of 66 beats per minute.

Critical reception
In a review of the album, Jon Freeman of Rolling Stone wrote that the duo are "at their most collectively potent" on "soulful cuts" like "Speechless," in which the production reinforces the song's message.

Commercial performance
"Speechless" debuted at number 30 on the Hot Country Songs chart dated June 2, 2018, and reached number one on the chart dated December 1, 2018, the duo's first number one on that chart. It stayed at number one for eight weeks.  "Speechless" debuted at number 46 on the Country Airplay chart dated August 18, 2018, and reached number one on the chart dated December 22, 2018. The song entered the Billboard Hot 100 chart dated September 22, 2018 at number 95, and peaked at number 24 in January 2019. "Speechless" was certified double Platinum on April 26, 2019 by the RIAA. It has sold 619,000 copies in the United States as of March 2020.

Music video
A music video directed by Patrick Tracy premiered May 18, 2018 concurrent with the song's digital release. The video features footage from Smyers' and Mooney's 2017 weddings, including the grooms' first looks at their brides, the brides walking down the aisle, and the couples' introductions at their respective receptions.

Charts

Weekly charts

Year-end charts

Decade-end charts

Certifications

Release history

Notes

References

2018 singles
2018 songs
Country ballads
2010s ballads
Dan + Shay songs
Tori Kelly songs
Song recordings produced by Scott Hendricks
Songs written by Dan Smyers
Songs written by Laura Veltz
Songs written by Shay Mooney
Warner Records Nashville singles
Songs written by Jordan Reynolds
Male–female vocal duets